Mädchen (German for "girl" or "girls") may refer to:

People
Mädchen Amick, American actress

Films
Mädchen, Mädchen (English: Girls, Girls), also known as Girls on Top, is a 2001 German film directed by Dennis Gansel
Mädchen, Mädchen 2 – Loft oder Liebe (Girls On Top 2), a 2004 German-language comedic film directed by Peter Gersina
Mädchen in Uniform (1958 film), West German drama film directed by Géza von Radványi and based on the play
Böse Mädchen (Bad Girls), a German comedy show by Sony Pictures
Mädchen ohne Grenzen (A Girl Without Boundaries), a French drama film from 1955, directed by Géza von Radványi
Das häßliche Mädchen ("The Ugly Girl"), a German comedy film made in early 1933
Das einfache Mädchen, a 1957 West German musical comedy film directed by Werner Jacobs
Das Mädchen Marion, a West German Heimatfilm, 1956
Ein Mädchen von 16 ½, East German film  1958
Mädchen am Kreuz (Crucified Girl), a 1929 German silent drama film directed by Jacob Fleck and Luise Fleck

Music
Mädchen (album), debut album of the German rock/pop duo Lucilectric
"Mädchen" (song), title song from album above by Lucilectric 
2000 Mädchen, punk song by Die Ärzte 1987
"Mädchen", song by Freddy Breck